Olga Yuryevna Krasko is a Russian actress, born 30 November 1981 in Kharkiv, Ukrainian SSR, Soviet Union. She has starred in Russian theater productions, and is noted that as the heroine in The Turkish Gambit (2005), she is the only female in a lead role in that film.

Background
Krasko graduated from Moscow Art Theatre School in 2002.

Filmography
 2001 – Četnické humoresky (Gendarme Stories, in Czech) as Klaudie
 2002 – Poirot's Failure as Flora
 2003 – Četnické humoresky 2 (Gendarme Stories 2, in Czech) as Klaudie
 2004 – Papa as Tanya
 2005 – The Turkish Gambit as Varvara Suvorova
 2005 – Time to Collect Stones as Nelya
 2005 – Hunting for Iberia as stewardess
 2005 – Yesenin as Lena
 2007 – Masha and the Sea as Masha
 2007 – Valeri Kharlamov. Extra Тime as Irina Kharlamovа
 2007 – Četnické humoresky 3 (Gendarme Stories 3, in Czech) as Klaudie
 2010 – In the Style of Jazz as Irina
2012 - present Sklifosovsky as Larisa Kulikova
 2013 – Sherlock Holmes as Lisa Baker
 2015 – Territory as Lyuda Hollywood

References

External links
 

1981 births
Actors from Kharkiv
Living people
21st-century Russian actresses
Moscow Art Theatre School alumni